Chandan Ka Palna  is a 1967 Bollywood film starring Dharmendra and Meena Kumari. The film was rated as above average at the box office.

Plot
No joy in the world can equal the happiness a man derives from watching his own child at play. Not all the riches in the world can compensate for the vacuum, the emptiness, created by the want of a child in a home. With a woman this yearning is a hundred times stronger and the outcome of her torment impossible beyond measure. Radha belonged to a rich family. Her sole aim in life after becoming a widow, was to see her son Ajit happy and fulfil the promise she had given to her husband that the family name and tradition would be perpetuated. Finding Ajit deeply in love with Shobha, the Raisaheb's daughter who too loved him no less, Radha got them married, hoping that Shobha would prove an ideal wife and daughter-in-law and their home would soon resound with merry laughter of a child, if not children. Three years went by and Radha was still waiting for the new arrival in the family. Her patience was running out. Desperate, she took Shobha to a doctor who, after prolonged examination and treatment, told her that God alone could help her fulfill her yearning for a grandchild. Radha's sorrow knows no bounds. She could not think of the family chain breaking off. She had to have a grandchild and fulfil her promise to her late husband. As a last resort, she takes Shobha to Gurudev, the spiritual soul revered by the family. Gurudev has pity on Radha's plight and after taking her into confidence, tells her the fact that Shobha can never have a child. Shobha after hearing this is left in a state of shock. Being very well aware of her mother-in-law's craving for a grandchild, life seems without a ray of hope for Shobha to live. She decides to put an end to it. It was better that way, she thinks, than to suffer the humiliation of being branded barren forever.
She knows how deeply her husband loved her and can very well imagine his dilemma when forced to marry again for the sake of a child. Ultimately, she starts walking in the direction of  fatal plunge to end all problems, to end herself. But destiny had other things written down for Shobha. Let that be unfolded on the screen in "Chandan Ka Palna", lest further knowledge of the proceedings spoil full enjoyment of the drama.

Cast
 Meena Kumari as Shobha Rai
 Dharmendra as Ajit
 Mehmood as Mahesh Chandra Mukhopadhyay
 Mumtaz as Sadhana
 Durga Khote as Radha Laxmidas
 Asit Sen as Seth Sevaram 
 Nazir Hussain as Rai Sahib Badrinath
 Bipin Gupta as Gurudev
 Dhumal as Gopi
 Mukri as Munshi Chhote Lal

Soundtrack

References

External links
 
 https://www.youtube.com/movie?v=Bqhmy7dQBR0&feature=relover

1967 films
1960s Hindi-language films
Films scored by R. D. Burman